The 1923 Geneva Covenanters football team was an American football team that represented Geneva College as an independent during the 1923 college football season. Led by Tom Davies in his first and only year as head coach, the team compiled a record of 6–2–1.

Schedule

References

Geneva
Geneva Golden Tornadoes football seasons
Geneva Geneva Covenanters football